Modern English (sometimes New English or NE (ME) as opposed to Middle English and Old English) is the form of the English language which has been spoken since the Great Vowel Shift in England, which began in the late 14th century and was completed by the 17th century.

With some differences in vocabulary, texts which date from the early 17th century, such as the works of William Shakespeare and the King James Bible, are considered Modern English texts, or more specifically, they are referred to as texts which were written in Early Modern English or they are referred to as texts which were written in Elizabethan English. Through colonization, English was adopted in many regions of the world by the British Empire, such as Anglo-America, the Indian subcontinent, Africa, Australia and New Zealand.

Modern English has many dialects spoken in many countries throughout the world, sometimes collectively referred to as the Anglosphere. These dialects include (but are not limited to) American, Australian, British (containing English English, Welsh English and Scottish English), Canadian, Caribbean, Hiberno-English, Indian, Sri Lankan, Pakistani, Nigerian, New Zealand, Philippine, Singaporean, and South African English.

According to the Ethnologue, there are almost 1 billion speakers of English as a first or second language. English is spoken as a first or a second language in many countries, with most native speakers being in the United States, the United Kingdom, Australia, Canada, New Zealand and Ireland; there are also large populations in India, Pakistan, the Philippines and Southern Africa. It "has more non-native speakers than any other language, is more widely dispersed around the world and is used for more purposes than any other language". Its large number of speakers, plus its worldwide presence, have made English a common language (lingua franca) "of the airlines, of the sea and shipping, of computer technology, of science and indeed of (global) communication generally".

Development
Modern English evolved from Early Modern English which was used from the beginning of the Tudor period until the Interregnum and Restoration in England. By the late 18th century, the British Empire had facilitated the spread of Modern English through its colonies and geopolitical dominance. Commerce, science and technology, diplomacy, art, and formal education all contributed to English becoming the first truly global language. Modern English also facilitated worldwide international communication. English was adopted in North America, India, parts of Africa, Australia, and many other regions. In the post-colonial period, some newly created nations that had multiple indigenous languages opted to continue using Modern English as the official language to avoid the political difficulties inherent in promoting one indigenous language above another.

Outline of changes
The following is an outline of the major changes in Modern English compared to its previous form (Middle English), and also some major changes in English over the course of the 20th century. Note, however, that these are generalizations, and some of these may not be true for specific dialects:

Morphology
 "like", "same as", and "immediately" are used as conjunctions.
 "The" becomes optional before certain combinations of noun phrases and proper names.

Pronouns
 Loss of distinction in most dialects between "whom" and "who" in favour of the latter.
 The elevation of singular they to some formal registers.
 Placement of frequency adverbs before auxiliary verbs.

Verbs
 Regularisation of some English irregular verbs
 Revival of the present ("mandative") English subjunctive
 "Will" preferred to "shall" to mark the future tense in the first person
 Do-support for the verb "have"
 Increase in multi-word verbs
 Development of auxiliary verbs "wanna", "gonna", "gotta" in informal discourse.
 Usage of English progressive verbs in certain present perfect and past perfect forms.

Phonology
Up until the American–British split (1600–1725), some major phonological changes in English included:
 Initial cluster reductions, like of /ɡn, kn/ into /n/: making homophones of gnat and nat, and not and knot.
 The meet–meat merger in most dialects: making the words "meat", "threat" and "great" have three different vowels, although all three words once rhymed. 
 The foot–strut split: so that "cut" and "put", and "pudding" and "budding" no longer rhyme; and "putt" and "put" are no longer homophones.
 The lot–cloth split: the vowel in words like "cloth" and "off" is pronounced with the vowel in "thought", as opposed to the vowel used in "lot".

After the American-British split, further changes to English phonology included:
 Non-rhotic (/ɹ/-dropping) accents develop in the English of England, Australasia, and South Africa.
 Happy-tensing: final lax [ɪ] becomes tense [i] in words like "happy". Absent from some dialects.
 Yod-dropping: the elision of /j/ in certain consonant clusters, like those found in "chute", "rude", "blue", "chews", and "Zeus".
 Wine–whine merger from the reduction of /ʍ/ to /w/ in all national standard varieties of English, except Scottish and Irish.
 In North American and Australasian English, /t, d/ are reduced to an alveolar tap between vowels, realised as [t̬] or [ɾ]
 Cot–caught merger the merger of /ɔ/ and /ɑ/ to /ɑ/ in some dialects of General American.

Syntax
disuse of the T–V distinction (thou, ye). Contemporary Modern English usually retains only the formal second-person personal pronoun, "you" (ye), used in both formal and informal contexts.
use of auxiliary verbs becomes mandatory in interrogative sentences.
"less", rather than "fewer", is used for countable nouns.
For English comparisons, syntactic comparison (more) is preferred to analytic comparison (-er).
 Usage of the Saxon genitive ('s) has extended beyond human referents.

Alphabet

Changes in alphabet and spelling were heavily influenced by the advent of printing and continental printing practices. 
The letter thorn (þ), which began to be replaced by th as early as Middle English, finally fell into disuse. In Early Modern English printing, thorn was represented with the Latin y, which appeared similar to thorn in blackletter typeface (𝖞). The last vestige of the letter was in ligatures of thorn, ye (thee), yt (that), yu (thou), which were still seen occasionally in the King James Bible of 1611 and in Shakespeare's folios.
The letters i and j, previously written as a single letter, began to be distinguished; likewise for u and v. This was a common development of the Latin alphabet during this period.
Consequently, Modern English came to use a purely Latin alphabet of 26 letters.

See also

History of the English language
International English

References

Citations

Sources

External links
 English at Ethnologue

History of the English language
English
15th-century establishments in England
English